The Honda NS500 is a 500cc Grand Prix racing motorcycle of the early 1980s, powered by a two-stroke V3 engine. Created as a replacement for the innovative but unsuccessful four-stroke NR500, the bike went against Honda's preference for four-stroke machines but proved very effective and quickly won the 1983 500cc World Championship with Freddie Spencer on board. Spencer was able to use the lower weight and superior handling of the NS500 to achieve higher cornering speeds, and getting on the power earlier leaving corners. Ron Haslam also won the 1983 Macau Grand Prix. After a relatively short lifespan the bike was replaced by the more successful two-stroke, V4 engine powered NSR500.

RS500 customer version
In 1983, Honda introduced a production version of the NS500 called the RS500 for privateer racers. These were very similar to the NS500 machines used by the factory racing team but, lacked the special exhaust system.

References

NS500
Grand Prix motorcycles
Motorcycles introduced in 1982
Two-stroke motorcycles
V3 engines